Wacky Waiters is a platform game written by Eugene Evans for the VIC-20 home computer. It was published by Imagine Software in 1982.

Gameplay
Gameplay involves controlling a waiter from one side of the screen to the other and back again, hopping in and out of lifts, and trying not to spill the drinks tray he is carrying to the beckoning customer on the opposite side of the screen.

References

Gordon Laing: The golden years of gaming, Personal Computer World, 23 June 2001.

1982 video games
VIC-20 games
VIC-20-only games
Platform games
Video games developed in the United Kingdom
Single-player video games